Shokalsky Strait is a strait in Severnaya Zemlya, Russia.

Geography
The Shokalsky Strait is an up to a 50 km-wide strait that separates Bolshevik Island from October Revolution Island, connecting the Kara Sea in the west with the Laptev Sea in the east. It is named after Russian oceanographer Yuly Shokalsky

Some fjords of Severnaya Zemlya have their mouths in the strait, such as Marat Fjord in October Revolution Island's eastern shore, as well as Partizan Fjord, Spartak Fjord and Thaelmann Fjord in Bolshevik Island northwestern coast.

Cape Baranov and its adjacent Prima Polar Station are located in the northern part of Bolshevik Island facing the Shokalsky Strait.

The Krasnoflotskiye Islands are located at the western end of the strait.

See also
Mikoyan Bay

References

Straits of Severnaya Zemlya
Bodies of water of the Sakha Republic
Straits of the Laptev Sea
Straits of the Kara Sea